Jacques Alberto Ngwem (born 3 August 1992) is a Cameroonian footballer who plays as a midfielder for FC Atyrau.

References

External links

1992 births
Living people
Cameroonian footballers
Association football forwards
Cameroonian expatriate sportspeople in Spain
Cameroonian expatriate sportspeople in Greece
Cameroonian expatriate sportspeople in Kazakhstan
Expatriate footballers in Spain
Expatriate footballers in Greece
Expatriate footballers in Kazakhstan
Super League Greece players
Football League (Greece) players
CD San Roque de Lepe footballers
Fokikos A.C. players
Atromitos F.C. players
PAS Lamia 1964 players
Volos N.F.C. players